Rogier Michael von Bergen (ca. 1553 probably in Bergen-op-Zoom – after middle 1623 in Dresden) was a Franco-Flemish composer, singer and Kapellmeister of the late Renaissance.

Life and work 
Michael came to Vienna as a child with his father Simon Michael († after 1566); his father was "probably the best mechanic and musician" during the reign of Emperor Ferdinand I (1556-1564) and was listed as a singer in the list of court chapels under Emperor Maximilian II from 1564 to 1566. Rogier presumably lived through a time as a choirboy in Vienna and in 1564 he joined the court chapel of Archduke Charles II in Graz as a choirboy. At first Johannes de Cleve, later Annibale Padovano was in charge of this chapel. The latter advised him to further studies with Andrea Gabrieli in Venice, which he did from 1569 to 1572. After his return to Germany, he accepted the position of a tenor singer in Ansbach at the court chapel of  George Frederick, Margrave of Brandenburg-Ansbach in 1572, where he remained until 1574.

On the recommendation of Emilie of Saxony, the sister of Elector August of Saxony, Michael took up a position as singer and musician at the Dresden court orchestra on 1 February 1575. The Elector listened to him himself, and the old Kapellmeister Antonio Scandello also tested his skills. The composer married in Dresden in 1578, and in the following years the seven sons Rogier, Tobias, Simon, Samuel, Christian, Georg and Daniel were born; four of these later also became composers. In the 1580 list of "Cantorey" he is listed as contralto with an annual salary of 144 gulden. As successor of Antonio Scandello, Giovanni Battista Pinello di Ghirardi (1544-1587) and Georg Forster, Michael reached the position of court bandmaster of the Elector of Saxony under the regency of Christian I, Elector of Saxony on 12 December 1587, and his sons Tobias, Simon and Samuel took part in Dresden as Choir boy. In 1611 Michael married for the second time, namely Sarah Petermann, the daughter of the Dresden Kapellknabeninspektor .

When John Georg I of Saxony took office in 1611, the court orchestra was at first largely dismissed and then gradually rebuilt from 1612 onwards. It seems that Michael was no longer taken into account in this rebuilding. When Elector Johann Georg travelled to Frankfurt with his entourage in 1612 for the election and coronation of Emperor Matthias, his name was not on the list of fellow travellers. Apparently Michael had been largely relieved of his position as Kapellmeister from 1612 onwards, with a full annual salary of 300 gulden. He was replaced several times by Michael Praetorius (1613 and 1614/15), and in 1615 Heinrich Schütz succeeded him. Rogier, however, continued to be active at the Saxon court. His salary was temporarily supplemented by funds to support the choir boys who lived with him. There is also evidence of the quarterly payment of 75 gulden on Trinity Sunday 1621. When Sarah, the composer's second wife, had died and was buried in January 1623, the sermon did not mention Michael's death, and the author Burckhard Grossmann mentioned him in the preface to his publication "Angst der Hellen" (Fear of the Light Ones), published in 1623, as one of the living. In March 1624, however, he was no longer listed as a member of the chapel. From this the music-historical researchers conclude that the composer died after mid-1623.

Importance 
In view of his many years of activity as a musician at the Dresden court (1575-1612), his complete musical oeuvre is not very extensive. In contrast to his predecessors Scandello and Pinello, known as composers, he cultivated the polyphonic stile antico in sacred music as well as the new Italian madrigal style, which was articulated in short quarter and eighth notes. This style was then largely adopted by his students. With his two surviving historical compositions for Immaculate Conception and Christmas, Michael deliberately took up the Passion of Jesus and the resurrection history of Antonio Scandello. Two other passions of his (after Matthew and Luke?) are missing. In these historical works, the literal speech of the acting individuals is set to music either unanimously or in several voices, depending on its significance, while the frame and other inner movements are set to music in several voices. In this way, the historical compositions of Rogier Michael form an important link between the corresponding works of Antonio Scandello and Heinrich Schütz. In an inventory of the Dresden Court Church from 1666, a "Handbuchlein von der Begnis, gebuhrt, Leiden und Auferstehung Jesu Christi in schwarzes Leder gebunden" is listed, which could have served Scandello, Michael as well as Schütz as a text template for their historical works. The 53 hymns in the second part of the Dresden hymn book of 1593 are based on simple, homophonies wisely written. In Michael's Introit of 1603, only the antiphon are in five voices on motet tables The antiphon is set to music in a wise manner, while the accompanying psalm texts appear in four parts in the simple Fauxbourdon movement, after which the antiphon is repeated.

From 1599 to 1603 the composer's pupils were the later Leipzig Thomaskantor Johann Hermann Schein and Michael's son Tobias Michael (1592-1657), Leipzig Thomaskantor from 1631 to 1657; among his pupils were also his sons Christian, Daniel and Samuel Michael as well as the later Freiberger Superintendent .

Work 
 Sacred works
 Der Gebreuchlichsten und vornembsten Gesenge D. Mart. Luth., Dresden 1593
 Visita quaesumus Domine for eight voices, 1596
 Te Deum: Herr Gott, dich loben wir for six voices, 1595
 2 Passionen, before 1601, lost
 teutsche Mess, before 1601, lost
 Die Empfängnis and Die Geburt unsers Herren Jesu Christi from one to six voices, 1602
 Hochzeitsmusik Drey schöne Stück for six voices, Dresden 1602
 Introitus dominicorum dierum ac praecipuorum festorum for five voices, Leipzig 1603
 Hochzeitsgesang Purpureum ver flores protulit for twelve voices, 1604
 Hochzeitsgesang Freue dich des Weibes deiner Jugend for eight voices, Leipzig 1604
 Hochzeitsmusik Illustri Rutae nobile ramum for eight voices, Leipzig 1607
 Ich freue mich des, das mir geredt ist fot six voices (without year)
 Speculum voluntatis Dei for six voices (without year)
 Hochzeitsgesang zu sechs Stimmen, Dresden 1611, lost
 Psalm 116 Das ist mir lieb for five voices, in Burckhard Grossmann's Angst der Hellen, Jena 1623
 Secular works
 Fiamma d’amor for five voices in the anthology Di Alessandro Orologio il secondo libro de madrigali, Dresden 1589
 Qualis uvidulis brasilica jugera, Gratulationsgedicht an Johann Georg I. zur Taufe des Kurprinzen Johann Georg II., Dresden 1613

Further reading 
 O. Kade: Rogier Michael, ein deutscher Tonsetzer des 16. Jahrhunderts. In Monatshefte für Musikgeschichte Nr. 2, 1870, .
 
 Reinhard Kade: Der Dresdener Kapellmeister Rogier Michael, ca. 1550–1619. In Vierteljahresschrift für Musikwissenschaft, No. 4, Leipzig 1889,.
 Joh. Frank: Die Introitus-Kompositionen von Rogier Michael. on WorldCat</ref> Dissertation an der Universität Gießen, 1937.
 Helmut Federhofer: Jugendjahre und Lehrer Rogier Michaels. In Archiv für Musikwissenschaft, No. 10, 1953, .
 Alfred Baumgartner: Propyläen Welt der Musik – Die Komponisten – Ein Lexikon in fünf Bänden. Volume 4. Propyläen, Berlin 1989, .
 M. Heinemann: Schütz’ Historienkonzeptionen: zum Projekt einer ›Empfängnishistorie‹ nach Rogier Michael. In Musik und Kirche, No. 64, 1994, .
 Wolfram Steude: Die Dresdner Hofkapelle zwischen Antonio Scandello und Heinrich Schütz (1580–1615). In Hans-Günter Ottenberg, Eberhard Steindorf (ed.): Der Klang der Sächsischen Staatskapelle Dresden. Olms, Hildesheim among others. 2001, .

References

External links 
 
 Lebenslauf von Rogier Michael auf der Website des Heinrich-Schütz-Hauses

Renaissance composers
17th-century Franco-Flemish composers
Sacred music composers
Belgian Baroque composers
1500s births
1623 deaths